The men's coxed pair competition at the 1960 Summer Olympics took place at took place at Lake Albano, Italy. It was held from 31 August to 3 September. There were 18 boats (54 competitors) from 18 nations, with each nation limited to a single boat in the event. The three nations on the podium were the same as those in 1956, though in a different order (and with only 1 of the 9 individual competitors being the same). The event was won by the United Team of Germany (bronze in 1956), with Bernhard Knubel and Heinz Renneberg rowing with Klaus Zerta the coxswain. Zerta is the youngest confirmed male gold medalist in Olympic history at 13 years and 283 days, just beating Hans Bourquin (also in the men's coxed pair, in 1928) by 9 days. The 1900 men's coxed pair gold-medal-winning coxswain may have been younger (estimates range from 7 to 12 years old), but the identities and ages of most coxswains in that event, including the gold medalist, are not known. The Soviet Union, bronze in 1956, took silver this time with Antanas Bagdonavičius, Zigmas Jukna, and Igor Rudakov. Defending champions the United States took bronze; Conn Findlay was the only man from the 1956 podium to return, this time with Richard Draeger as his rowing partner and Kent Mitchell the coxswain.

Background

This was the 10th appearance of the event. Rowing had been on the programme in 1896 but was cancelled due to bad weather. The men's coxed pair was one of the original four events in 1900, but was not held in 1904, 1908, or 1912. It returned to the programme after World War I and was held every Games from 1924 to 1992, when it (along with the men's coxed four) was replaced with the men's lightweight double sculls and men's lightweight coxless four.

Only 1 of the 12 competitors from the 1956 coxed pair final returned: Conn Findlay from the gold-medal United States team. The United Team of Germany had been dominant the last few years other than their second-place finish to the Americans in the 1956 Games, winning four European championships with various crew compositions.

Czechoslovakia, Romania, Spain, and Uruguay each made their debut in the event. The United States made its eighth appearance, matching the absent France for most among nations to that point.

Competition format

The coxed pair event featured three-person boats, with two rowers and a coxswain. It was a sweep rowing event, with the rowers each having one oar (and thus each rowing on one side). The course used the 2000 metres distance that became the Olympic standard in 1912 (with the exception of 1948). 

This rowing competition consisted of two main rounds (heats and final), as well as a repechage round that allowed teams that did not win their heats to advance to the final.

 Semifinals: Three heats. With 18 boats entered, there were six boats per heat. The winner of each heat advanced directly to the final; all other boats went to the repechage.
 Repechage: Three heats. With 15 boats racing in but not winning their initial heats, there were five boats per repechage heat. The top boat in each repechage heat advanced to the final, with the remaining boats eliminated.
 Final: The final consisted of the six boats that had won either the preliminary heats or the repechage heats.

Schedule

All times are Central European Time (UTC+1)

Results

Semifinals

Heat 1

Heat 2

Heat 3

Repechage

Repechage heat 1

Repechage heat 2

Repechage heat 3

Final

Results summary

References

Rowing at the 1960 Summer Olympics